Mirzəhaqverdili (also, Mirzaakhverdili and Mirza-Akhverdly) is a village and municipality in the Aghjabadi Rayon of Azerbaijan.  It has a population of 466.

References 

Populated places in Aghjabadi District